is a Japanese Orientalist. He was Chair of Hebrew, Israelite Antiquities and Ugaritic at Leiden University in the Netherlands from 1991 till 2003 and is most notable for his studies of Hebrew and Aramaic (including Syriac) linguistics and the ancient translations of the Bible, notably of the Septuagint.

Education
After studying general linguistics and biblical languages under the late Prof. M. Sekine at Tokyo Kyoiku University, he studied at the Hebrew University of Jerusalem, completing his dissertation Emphasis in Biblical Hebrew with the late Prof. C. Rabin as supervisor, and obtaining his Ph.D. in 1970.

Career
He taught Semitic languages including Modern Hebrew as Lecturer in Manchester University, U.K. (1970–80), as Professor of Middle Eastern studies at Melbourne University (1980–91), Australia, then moved in 1991 to Leiden University (1991-2003), The Netherlands, as Professor of the Hebrew Language and Literature, the Israelite Antiquities, and the Ugaritic language. In addition, he was editor of Abr-Nahrain [now Ancient Near Eastern Studies] 1980-92, and also edited or co-edited volumes on Ancient Hebrew Semantics, Qumran Aramaic, and Qumran Hebrew. His comprehensive syntax of Septuagint Greek appeared in 2016. He co-founded, in 2000, Dutch-Japanese-Indonesian Dialogue against the background of the Pacific War. He is Representative of The Japanese Language Biblical Church in The Netherlands.

Honors
In the academic year 2001-02 he was a Forschungpreisträger of Alexander von Humboldt Foundation and in that capacity a visiting professor at the Faculty of Divinity at Göttingen University, Germany. He is Fellow of the Australian Academy of Humanities, and since 2006 Honorary Fellow of the Academy of the Hebrew Language. On 27 September 2017 he was awarded the Burkitt Medal for Hebrew Bible Studies by the British Academy, which judged that over the past six decades he had made outstanding contributions to the study of the Hebrew grammar and syntax, and the Septuagint (an ancient Greek translation of the Old Testament). Francis Crawford Burkitt (1864-1935) was a distinguished Cambridge professor with significant contributions on the textual criticism of the New Testament and Eastern churches. In memory of his achievements the Academy has been awarding a medal since 1925 in alternating years to New Testament and Old Testament scholars for their outstanding contributions.

Retired
Since retiring in 2003 from the Leiden chair, he has been visiting every year, teaching biblical languages and the Septuagint as a volunteer a minimum of five weeks in Asian countries which suffered under Japanese militarism in the 20th century. His thoughts and reflections on this yearly teaching ministry up to the year 2015 can now be read in English in "My Via dolorosa: Along the trails of the Japanese imperialism in Asia" (AuthorHouse U.K. 2016).

Selected publications
Muraoka's major publications (only English publications are mentioned) include: 
 Emphatic Words and Structures in Biblical Hebrew (1985)
 Modern Hebrew for Biblical Scholars (1982, 1995)
 A Greek-Hebrew/Aramaic Index to I Esdras (1984)
 Classical Syriac for Hebraists (1987, 2nd revised ed. 2013)
 A Grammar of Biblical Hebrew [P. Joüon's grammar translated from French and extensively revised and updated] (1991, 2006)
 A Greek-English Lexicon of the Septuagint (Twelve Prophets) (1993)
 Classical Syriac: A Basic Grammar with a Chrestomathy (1997, 2005)
 With B. Porten, A Grammar of Egyptian Aramaic (1998, 2003)
 A Hebrew/Aramaic-Greek Index Keyed to Hatch and Redpath's Septuagint Concordance (1998)
 A Greek-English Lexicon of the Septuagint (Chiefly of the Pentateuch and the Twelve Prophets) (2002)
 A Greek-English Lexicon of the Septuagint [covering the entire Septuagint] (2009)
 A Greek-Hebrew/Aramaic Two-way Index to the Septuagint (2010)
 A Grammar of Qumran Aramaic (2011)
 An Introduction to Egyptian Aramaic (2012)
 A Biblical Aramaic Reader with an Outline Grammar (2015)
 A Syntax of Septuagint Greek (2016).
 A Biblical Hebrew Reader with an Outline Grammar (2017)
 Jacob of Serugh's Hexaemeron. Edited and translated. 2018. Leuven.
 A Syntax of Qumran Hebrew. 2020. Leuven.
 Why Read the Bible in the Original Languages? 2020. Leuven
 The Community Rule 1QS, 1QSa and 1QSb. A philological commentary. 2022. Leuven.
 Articles in G. Khan (ed.), Encyclopaedia of Hebrew and Hebrew Linguistics'', 2013, Leiden:
 “Community Rule (1QS),” I.493a-95b;
 “Copula: Biblical Hebrew,” I  623a-24b;
 “Emphatic Lamed,” I 820b-821a;
 “Existential: Biblical Hebrew,” I.881b-884b;
 “Isaiah Scroll (1Isaa),” II.343b-348a;
 “Neuter,” II.822b-23b;
 “Phrasal verb: Pre-modern Hebrew,” III.141b-42a;
 “Prepositional verbs,” III.219a-20a;
 “Prophetic perfect,” III 279a-80a.

References

Japanese Hebraists
Scholars of Koine Greek
1938 births
Japanese orientalists
People from Hiroshima
Living people
Hebrew University of Jerusalem alumni
Academics of the University of Manchester
Academic staff of the University of Melbourne
Academic staff of Leiden University